Braddell MRT station is an underground Mass Rapid Transit (MRT) station located on the North South line (NSL) in Toa Payoh, Singapore. Unlike the other stations on the NSL (apart from Canberra station), the station has side platforms due to engineering constraints. Located underneath the traffic junction of Lorong 1 Toa Payoh and Lorong 2 Toa Payoh, Braddell station primarily serves the estates in the northern part of Toa Payoh New Town.

Opened on 7 November 1987, Braddell station is one of the first five MRT stations on the network.

History

When the MRT system was under planning since 1981, MRTC tried to design the track system and position in order to enable the station to have a common platform, like in the mainstream MRT stations. However, the closely built HDB Blocks in Toa Payoh estate meant that the MRT system tunnels had to be constructed directly under Lorong 2 Toa Payoh, following the bend of the road, in the area between Lorong 1 Toa Payoh and Toa Payoh MRT Station. The result made it impossible for tracks to diverge at a common platform station, as the angle Southbound trains would turn when approaching and leaving the station would be too great. Additionally, it would be unfeasible to change the position of the station, because moving it south would render it too close to Toa Payoh MRT station, while moving it north would be impossible because of surrounding HDB blocks and JTC Flatted factories. It was thus built with side platforms unlike other NSL stations. Construction of this station was awarded to Singapore Belgium Contractors Limited under Contract 103A on 7 April 1984. To facilitate the construction, two of the six lanes at Toa Payoh Lorong 1 and 2, were temporarily closed from February 1985 to February 1986. Braddell was among the first of five stations opened for operation on 7 November 1987.

Incidents
On 7 October 2017, water got into a section of the tunnel between Bishan and Braddell MRT stations during a heavy downpour in the afternoon, which disrupted train services along 13 stations on the North South line for several hours. This case of water entering MRT tunnels is believed to be the first time it has affected train service along the NSL. Separately, at about 5.55pm, a small fire was spotted trackside in the tunnel between the Marina Bay and Raffles Place stations, but it had died down by itself. It is not clear if it is linked to the flood, although electrical short circuits caused by water had sparked tunnel fires before. Train services between Marina South Pier and Newton were restored on the day itself at about 9.20pm. Train services between Newton and Ang Mo Kio were fully resumed at 1.36pm the following day after overnight efforts to clear the water in the tunnel, after nearly 21 hours of service disruption, being one of the worst disruptions in SMRT Trains Ltd's history. It was revealed that the overflowing in the tunnel was caused by a malfunction in the water pumping system, which has since been repaired.

References

External links

 

Railway stations in Singapore opened in 1987
Toa Payoh
Mass Rapid Transit (Singapore) stations